Heinrich Laretei (4 January 1892 in Õisu – 3 April 1973 in Stockholm) was an Estonian politician, diplomat and soldier. He was a member of the II and III Riigikogu. 1926 he was Minister of the Interior.

Heinrich Laretei's wife was Alma Laretei. They had two daughters, Maimu Evéquoz (1920–2012) and Käbi Laretei (1922–2014).

References

1892 births
1973 deaths
People from Mulgi Parish
People from Kreis Pernau
Demobilised Soldiers' Union politicians
Settlers' Party politicians
Ministers of the Interior of Estonia
Ministers of Foreign Affairs of Estonia
Members of the Riigikogu, 1923–1926
Members of the Riigikogu, 1926–1929
Ambassadors of Estonia to Sweden
Ambassadors of Estonia to the Soviet Union
Russian military personnel of World War I
Estonian military personnel of the Estonian War of Independence
Recipients of the Cross of Liberty (Estonia)
Estonian World War II refugees
Estonian emigrants to Sweden